Diane Schuur & the Count Basie Orchestra is a 1987 live album by Diane Schuur, accompanied by the Count Basie Orchestra, arranged by Frank Foster.

Three years after Count Basie's death, the Count Basie Orchestra is featured here as a ghost band, led by Frank Foster. This was also the last performance of Freddie Green, who died a week later.

At the Grammy Awards of 1988, for her performance on Diane Schuur & the Count Basie Orchestra, Schuur won her second consecutive Grammy Award for Best Jazz Vocal Performance, Female.

Track listing
 "Deedles' Blues" (Morgan Ames) – 3:30
 "Caught a Touch of Your Love" (James Best (A.K.A. James Bugno), Craig Bickhardt, Jack Keller) – 3:13
 "Trav'lin' Light" (Johnny Mercer, Jimmy Mundy, Trummy Young) – 4:24
 "I Just Found Out About Love" (Harold Adamson, Jimmy McHugh) – 2:45
 "Travelin' Blues" (Dave Brubeck, Iola Brubeck) – 4:04
 "I Loves You Porgy" (George Gershwin, Ira Gershwin, DuBose Heyward) – 3:09
 "You Can Have It" (Ames, Frank Foster) – 3:25
 "Only You" (Ames, Bob Florence) – 4:44
 "Everyday" (Peter Chatman) – 3:09
 "We'll Be Together Again" (Carl T. Fischer, Frankie Laine) – 4:06
 "Until I Met You" (Freddie Green, Don Wolf) – 2:53
 "Climbing Higher Mountains" (Aretha Franklin) – 2:34

Personnel

Performance
 Diane Schuur - vocals, piano
 Count Basie Orchestra:
 Frank Foster - arranger, tenor saxophone
 Lynn Seaton - double bass
 Dennis Mackrel - drums
 Freddie Green - guitar
 Danny Turner - alto saxophone
 Danny House 
 John Williams - baritone saxophone
 Eric Dixon - tenor saxophone
 Kenny Hing
 Clarence Banks - trombone
 Bill Hughes - bass trombone
 Mel Wanzo - lead trombone
 Dennis Wilson - trombone
 Sonny Cohn - trumpet
 Melton Mustafa - trumpet
 Bob Ojeda - trumpet
 Byron Stripling - lead trumpet

Production
 Dave Grusin - executive producer
 Larry Rosen - executive producer
 Morgan Ames - producer
 Jeffrey Weber - producer
 Robert DeLaGarza - assistant engineer
 Bill-Dog Dooley
 Mark McKenna
 Mike Morongell
 Claudio Ordenes
 Andy Baltimore - design, creative director
 David Gibb - design
 Dave Kunze
 Ivan Salgado
 Dan Serrano
 Bruce Botnick - digital editing, editing
 Allen Sides - engineer
 Takao Ogawa - liner notes
 John S. Wilson
 Aaron A. Woodward - management
 Wally Traugott - mastering
 Judy Clapp - mixing, mixing assistant
 Don Murray - mixing
 Glenn Wexler photography, cover photo
 Mike Johnson - photography
 Janet Van Ham

References

Diane Schuur live albums
Count Basie Orchestra live albums
Albums arranged by Frank Foster (musician)
1987 live albums
GRP Records live albums
Grammy Award for Best Jazz Vocal Performance, Female